Lisa Sounio (born 1970) is a past CEO and chairperson of social networking site Dopplr. She is also the CEO of her own design management consultancy Sonay. She has a background in industrial design management. Early in her career she worked as a sales- and export manager in the Finnish furniture industry. Before becoming an entrepreneur she worked for Iittala where she was in charge of branding and product design development.

Sounio has a master's degree from the Helsinki School of Economics. She has also studied at the University of Art and Design Helsinki and at the Helsinki University of Technology. She is also a columnist and public speaker. Sounio is married to and a business partner of Marko Ahtisaari.

She was a candidate for the 2014 Finnish European Parliament election, on the National Coalition Party list, but was not elected.

References

External links 

1970 births
Living people
Businesspeople from Helsinki
Finnish women in business